KN motif and ankyrin repeat domain-containing protein 2 is a protein that in humans is encoded by the KANK2 gene.

References

External links

Further reading